Sergio Martínez (8 September 1943 – 2 October 1979) was a Cuban cyclist. He competed in the individual road race and the team pursuit events at the 1968 Summer Olympics.

References

External links
 

1943 births
1979 deaths
Cuban male cyclists
Olympic cyclists of Cuba
Cyclists at the 1968 Summer Olympics
Sportspeople from Havana